Why He Gave Up is a 1911 American short silent comedy film starring Fred Mace and Mabel Normand. The film was co-directed by Mack Sennett and Henry Lehrman and shot in Huntington, Long Island.

Cast
 Fred Mace as The Husband
 Mabel Normand as The Wife
 Edward Dillon as One of the Husband's Chums
 William J. Butler as One of the Husband's Chums
 Kathleen Butler as At Club
 William Beaudine as At Club
 W.C. Robinson as Cafe Employee / At Club
 J. Waltham as At Club

References

External links
 

1911 films
1911 comedy films
Silent American comedy films
American silent short films
Biograph Company films
Films directed by Henry Lehrman
Films directed by Mack Sennett
Films shot in New York (state)
American black-and-white films
1911 short films
American comedy short films
1910s American films